Esperanto derivation is for the most part regular and predictable: One can normally understand new words that are built upon known roots, and can create new words on the fly while speaking. However, there is an infix -um- that has no inherent meaning, but derives words that cannot be readily derived with dedicated affixes. Such derivations must be memorized individually, though because the root already exists, they may be more easily learned than a completely new word. Because of its irregularity and unpredictability, over-use of the infix -um- is discouraged. Over time substitutes have been developed for some of the original -um- words and new ones have been coined. Regular derivations may in some cases substitute for a word in -um-; in other cases they may be similar but not exact replacements; and in still others, a substitutable word may be considered jargon (like using 'a catarrh' for 'a cold' in English).

Semi-regular use
One area where the derivations is -um- are nearly predictable is in pieces of clothing named after the corresponding parts of the body: kolumo 'collar' (from 'neck'); buŝumo 'muzzle' (from 'mouth'); manumo 'cuff' (from 'hand': does not mean 'glove'); kalkanumo 'heel (of a shoe)'; plandumo 'sole (of a shoe)'; ingvenumo 'jockstrap' (from 'groin'); hufumo 'horseshoe' (from 'hoof'); nazumo 'pince-nez, spectacles' (from 'nose', now uncommon). Many of these are the only word for the concept, though the last two have substitutes: hufofero (lit. "hoof-iron") and okulvitroj (lit. "eye-glasses"). (Note however that brakumi from 'arm' does not mean 'sleeve' but 'to embrace'.) In a similar vein, cicumo is a 'nipple (on a bottle)', from '(human) nipple' (body-part extension), and fenestrumo is 'shutter', from 'window' (a covering of a part).

Another predictable set are formed from numbers to indicate numerical bases: duuma 'binary', okuma 'octal', dekuma 'decimal' (dekuma logaritmo 'base-10 logarithm'), dekduuma 'duodecimal', deksesuma 'hexadecimal', dudekuma 'vigesimal', and sesdekuma 'sexagesimal'.

Consciously using the senses is a meaning that is partially predictable, though it only fills in meanings that do not have dedicated roots like 'watch' or 'listen'. These are fingrumi 'to touch/feel/palpate' (from 'finger'); gustumi 'to taste s.t.' (from gusti 'to taste (of food)'); and okulumi 'to make eyes at' (from 'eye'). For the latter, simple okuli is often used, and it has a sexual connotation that is not predictable. The word for the senses is sentumo, from senti 'to feel'.

Forms of execution also take -um-: krucumi 'to crucify', pendumi 'to hang', gasumi 'to gas', ŝtonumi 'to stone', dekumi, kvaronumi 'to quarter', palisumi 'to impale', radumi 'to break on the wheel'. Substitute forms with -mortigi 'to kill' are nearly as common: krucmortigi, ŝtonmortigi, etc.

A recent innovation is to spend time doing something, especially for pleasure. Butikumi (from butiko 'a shop') means 'to go shopping', and tends to be used in the sense of shopping for pleasure. Similarly, amikumi means 'to pass time with one's friends'; esperantumi 'to spend time using Esperanto'; kafumi 'to have a cup of coffee', retumi 'to surf the Web' (from reto 'net, Internet'), and urbumi 'to go into town' (from urbo 'town, city'). These latter words are not yet in dictionaries.

List of derivations
The following is a fairly complete list of words with a reasonable degree of acceptance and that have not been covered above.

See also
The infix -um- at Wiktionary
Special Esperanto adverbs, including those with the ad hoc part-of-speech suffix -aŭ

References

Grammar, Infix -um